Mustapha Chareuf (18 May 1925 – 18 September 1957) was an Algerian racing cyclist. He rode in the 1952 Tour de France.

References

1925 births
1957 deaths
Algerian male cyclists
Place of birth missing